Fudbalski klub Hajduk is a Montenegrin football club based in the town of Bar. They currently compete in the Montenegrin Third League - South.

History
FK Hajduk was founded at 2009 in Bar, and currently is the youngest football club in that coastal town. Since establishing, FK Hajduk is playing in the  Montenegrin Third League - South.
Until now, FK Hajduk made best results in the Southern Region Cup by winning it two times. In 2016, the club were in financial trouble with club president Vasilije Milošević organising a fundraising event to keep Hajduk afloat.

Honours and achievements
Southern Region Cup – 2
winners (2): 2015, 2016

Stadium

FK Hajduk plays its important home games at Stadion Topolica in Bar, whose capacity is 2,500 seats. The stadium is built at the coast of Adriatic Sea, near the city beach and Port of Bar. The stadium has floodlights, and except football, it's the main athletic field in Montenegro. For other matches, FK Hajduk is using smaller stadium at Topolica Sports Complex, whose capacity is 1,000 seats.

See also
Bar
Montenegrin Third League

References

External links
 FK Hajduk Bar - Youth selections

Association football clubs established in 2009
Football clubs in Montenegro
2009 establishments in Montenegro